Ivar Larsen Hvamstad (14 December 1843 – 5 October 1903) was a Norwegian educator and politician for the Liberal Party.

He was elected to the Parliament of Norway from the constituency Christians Amt in 1879 and 1882. He served through 1885, representing the Liberal Party from its foundation in 1884. He was a teacher in Gran and farmer in Brandbu, and was the mayor of Brandbu for several years.

Together with Marthe Pedersdatter Alm (1846–1928) he had the son Ivar Hvamstad, who became a member of Parliament in 1916.

References

1843 births
1903 deaths
People from Gran, Norway
Norwegian educators
Liberal Party (Norway) politicians
Mayors of places in Oppland
Members of the Storting